The 1995–96 NBA season was the 50th season for the Boston Celtics in the National Basketball Association. A new era began for the Celtics as they moved into their current home, a state of the art new arena then known as the Fleet Center (now TD Garden). In addition, this also ended their practice of playing occasional home games in Hartford's Civic Center. There was much speculation during the previous off-season over who would coach the team after the firing of Chris Ford, with candidates that included former Celtics coaches Dave Cowens and K. C. Jones, and even former Celtic player Paul Silas. Ultimately, General Manager M. L. Carr decided to hire himself as the team's new head coach. The Celtics also signed free agent and former Boston College star Dana Barros, who won the Most Improved Player award the previous season with the Philadelphia 76ers.

The Celtics started their season losing their first game at the Fleet Center, 101–100 to the Milwaukee Bucks on November 3, 1995. Near the end of the month, the team traded Sherman Douglas to the Bucks in exchange for Todd Day and Alton Lister, as they played around .500 with a 12–12 start. However, the magic was clearly gone for the Celtics as they lost 15 of their next 18 games, holding a 17–30 record at the All-Star break, finishing fifth in the Atlantic Division with a 33–49 record, and failing to qualify for the playoffs.

Dino Radja led the team with 19.7 points, 9.8 rebounds and 1.5 blocks per game, but was out for the remainder of the season with an ankle injury after 53 games, while Rick Fox averaged 14.0 points, 5.6 rebounds, 4.6 assists and 1.4 steals per game, and Barros provided the team with 13.0 points and 3.8 assists per game. In addition, David Wesley contributed 12.3 points and 4.8 assists per game, while Dee Brown and top draft pick Eric Williams both provided with 10.7 points per game each, and second-year guard Greg Minor contributed 9.6 points per game. On the defensive side, second-year center Eric Montross averaged 7.2 points and 5.8 rebounds per game, but only played 61 games due to a sprained ankle, and Pervis Ellison provided with 5.3 points, 6.5 rebounds and 1.4 blocks per game. 

Following the season, Montross was traded to the Dallas Mavericks in exchange for the sixth overall pick in the 1996 NBA draft.

Draft picks

Roster

Regular season

Season standings

Record vs. opponents

Game log

Player statistics

Awards and records

Transactions

Overview

Trades

Player Transactions Citation:

References

See also
 1995–96 NBA season

Boston Celtics seasons
Boston Celtics
Boston Celtics
Boston Celtics
Celtics
Celtics